Merrilliopanax listeri is a species of flowering plant in the family Araliaceae, native to the east Himalayas, Nepal, south-central China and Myanmar. It was first described by George King in 1898 as Dendropanax listeri.

Conservation
Merrilliopanax chinensis was assessed as "critically endangered" in the 2004 IUCN Red List, where it is said to be native only to Yunnan in China. , M. chinensis was regarded as a synonym of Merrilliopanax listeri, which has a wider distribution, including the Himalayas and Myanmar.

References

Araliaceae
Flora of South-Central China
Flora of East Himalaya
Flora of Myanmar
Flora of Nepal
Plants described in 1942